Hogimiyau is located on the north side of Goroka, Eastern Highlands Province. It has the total population of 2,000 people. Tokano is a common language spoken throughout Hogimayau. Coffee is one of the main cash crops in Highlands region.

References

Populated places in Eastern Highlands Province